A sea breeze or onshore breeze is any wind that blows from a large body of water toward or onto a landmass; it develops due to differences in air pressure created by the differing heat capacities of water and dry land. As such, sea breezes are more localised than prevailing winds. Because land heats up much faster than water under solar radiation, a sea breeze is a common occurrence along coasts after sunrise. By contrast, a land breeze or offshore breeze is the reverse effect: dry land also cools more quickly than water and, after sunset, a sea breeze dissipates and the wind instead flows from the land towards the sea. Sea breezes and land breezes are both important factors in coastal regions' prevailing winds. The term offshore wind may refer to any wind over open water. 

Wind farms are often situated near a coast to take advantage of the normal daily fluctuations of wind speed resulting from sea or land breezes.  While many onshore wind farms and offshore wind farms do not rely on these winds, a nearshore wind farm is a type of offshore wind farm located on shallow coastal waters to take advantage of both sea and land breezes. (For practical reasons, other offshore wind farms are situated further out to sea and rely on prevailing winds rather than sea breezes.)

Cause
The sea has a greater heat capacity than land, so the surface of the sea warms up more slowly than the surface of the land. As the temperature of the surface of the land rises, the land heats the air above it by convection. The warming air expands and becomes less dense, decreasing the pressure over the land near the coast. The air above the sea has a relatively higher pressure, causing air near the coast to flow towards the lower pressure over land.  The strength of the sea breeze is directly proportional to the temperature difference between the land and the sea.  If a strong offshore wind is present (that is, a wind greater than ) and opposing the direction of a possible sea breeze, the sea breeze is not likely to develop.

Effects

A sea-breeze front is a weather front created by a sea breeze, also known as a convergence zone.  The cold air from the sea meets the warmer air from the land and creates a boundary like a shallow cold front.  When powerful this front creates cumulus clouds, and if the air is humid and unstable,  the front can sometimes trigger thunderstorms.  If the flow aloft is aligned with the direction of the sea breeze, places experiencing the sea breeze frontal passage will have benign, or fair, weather for the remainder of the day.  At the front warm air continues to flow upward and cold air continually moves in to replace it and so the front moves progressively inland.  Its speed depends on whether it is assisted or hampered by the prevailing wind, and the strength of the thermal contrast between land and sea.  At night, the sea breeze usually changes to a land breeze, due to a reversal of the same mechanisms.

Sea breezes in Florida

Thunderstorms caused by powerful sea breeze fronts frequently occur in Florida, a peninsula surrounded on both the east and west by the Atlantic Ocean and Gulf of Mexico, respectively.  During the wet season which typically lasts from June through September/October, any direction that the winds are blowing would always be off the water, thus making Florida the place most often struck by lightning in the United States, and one of the most on Earth. These storms can also produce significant hail due to the tremendous updraft it causes in the atmosphere especially during times when the upper atmosphere is cooler such as during the spring or fall.

On calm summer afternoons with little prevailing wind, sea breezes from both coasts may collide in the middle, creating especially severe storms down the center of the state. These thunderstorms can drift towards either the west or east coast depending on the relative strengths of the sea breezes, and sometimes survive to move out over the water at night, creating spectacular cloud-to-cloud lightning shows for hours after sunset. Due to its large size Lake Okeechobee may also contribute to this activity by creating its own lake breeze which collides with the east and west coast sea breezes.

In Cuba similar sea breeze collisions with the northern and southern coasts sometimes lead to storms.

Land breezes
At night, the land cools off faster than the ocean due to differences in their heat capacity, which forces the dying of the daytime sea breeze as the temperature of the land approaches that of the ocean. If the land becomes cooler than the adjacent sea surface temperature, the air pressure over the water will be lower than that of the land, setting up a land breeze blowing from the land to the sea, as long as the environmental surface wind pattern is not strong enough to oppose it. If there is sufficient moisture and instability available, the land breeze can cause showers, or even thunderstorms, over the water. Overnight thunderstorm development offshore due to the land breeze can be a good predictor for the activity on land the following day, as long as there are no expected changes to the weather pattern over the following 12–24 hours. This is mainly because the strength of the land breeze is weaker than the sea breeze. The land breeze will die once the land warms up again the next morning.

See also
Fremantle Doctor, the local name for the sea breeze in and around Perth, Western Australia
Southerly buster, a sea breeze, though usually a storm, which is experienced in the southeast coast of New South Wales, southern coast of Victoria and New Zealand
Mountain breeze and valley breeze

References

External links
Sea and Land Breezes

Breeze
Wind